Patric Englund (born June 3, 1970) is a former Swedish professional ice hockey player who played in the Swedish Hockey League and Norwegian GET-ligaen. Englund was drafted in the eighth round of the 1990 NHL Entry Draft by the Philadelphia Flyers, but he never played professionally in North America. He spent the first ten seasons of his professional career in Sweden, playing nine seasons with AIK IF, and the final six seasons of his career in Norway with Vålerenga.

Career statistics

References

External links

1970 births
Living people
AIK IF players
HV71 players
Philadelphia Flyers draft picks
Ice hockey people from Stockholm
Swedish ice hockey left wingers
Vålerenga Ishockey players
Swedish expatriate ice hockey players in Norway